Tlazala de Fabela is a town and municipal seat of the municipality of the Isidro Fabela Municipality in the State of Mexico in Mexico. The municipality covers an area of  179.82 km².

As of 2005, the municipality had a total population of 2,002.

References

Municipalities of the State of Mexico
Populated places in the State of Mexico